In classical Greek architecture, a stylobate is the top step of the crepidoma, the stepped platform upon which colonnades of temple columns are placed (it is the floor of the temple). The platform was built on a leveling course that flattened out the ground immediately beneath the temple.

Etymology
The term stylobate comes from the Ancient Greek στυλοβάτης, consisting of στῦλος stylos, "column", and βατός batos, "walkable, mountable", itself derived from βαίνω baino "to stride, to walk".

Terminology
Some methodologies use the word stylobate to describe only the topmost step of the temple's base, while stereobate is used to describe the remaining steps of the platform beneath the stylobate and just above the leveling course. Others, like John Lord, use the term to refer to the entire platform.

Architectural use
The stylobate was often designed to relate closely to the dimensions of other elements of the temple. In Greek Doric temples, the length and width of the stylobate were related, and in some early Doric temples the column height was one third the width of the stylobate. The Romans, following Etruscan architectural tradition, took a different approach in using a much higher stylobate that typically had steps only in the front, leading to the portico.

In modern architecture the stylobate is the upper part of the stepped basement of the building, or the common basement floor, combining several buildings. Today, stylobates are popular in use in the construction of high-rise buildings.

See also
 Scamilli impares

Notes

References

Architectural elements
Ancient Greek architecture